AACI may refer to:

 Anglo-American Committee of Inquiry
 Asociación Arte Concreto-Invención
 Association of American Cancer Institutes
 Association of Americans and Canadians in Israel